Ivan Sotnikov (15 August 1913 in Oleshky – January 2004) was a Soviet sprint canoeist who competed in the early 1950s. He finished seventh in the K-1 10000 m event at the 1952 Summer Olympics in Helsinki.

References
Ivan Sotnikov's profile at Sports Reference.com
Biography of Ivan Sotnikov 
Profile of Ivan Sotnikov 

1913 births
2004 deaths
People from Kherson Oblast
People from Taurida Governorate
Canoeists at the 1952 Summer Olympics
Olympic canoeists of the Soviet Union
Soviet male canoeists
Ukrainian male canoeists
Sportspeople from Zaporizhzhia Oblast